Franca Sebastiani, known early in her career under the pseudonym Franchina (San Casciano dei Bagni, 25 January 1949 – Rome, 27 May 2015), was an Italian singer.

Her daughter Cristiana was born in 1971 from her relationship with Massimo Ranieri.

References

1949 births
2015 deaths
Italian women singers
Italian pop singers
Deaths from cancer in Lazio